"Poor Side of Town" is a song by Johnny Rivers that reached number one on the U.S. Billboard Hot 100 and the RPM Canadian Chart in November 1966. The song marked a turning point in Rivers' career that saw him move away from his earlier rock and roll style toward pop ballads.

Song
Johnny Rivers would recall of "Poor Side of Town": "I don’t know what inspired it…It was not from any personal experience, because I was living in Beverly Hills." Although he'd describe it as "an easy song to write",  Rivers would say the song: "took…about five months to write…I kept writing little bits and pieces of it." With the parent album of "Poor Side of Town": Changes, Rivers shifted from southern rock to an orchestral pop sound with a string-&-brass arrangement by Marty Paich who had orchestrated the recent Top 5 hits by the Mamas & the Papas, the LA Phil musicians who had played on the Mamas & Papas tracks also playing on Changes.

The single edit of "Poor Side of Town" reduces the coda of the album track, which following the repeated lyric line:  "Oh with you by my side" continues, finishing up the verse, and following the repeated guitar riff, repeats the sung introduction of the scatting, before the song fades out.

Cover versions
The 5th Dimension recorded the song for the 1967 album, Up, Up and Away.
Al Wilson released a version of the song as a single from his 1968 album, Searching for the Dolphins. It reached No.75 in the U.S. in 1969.
Beverly Bremers released a version of the song on her 1972 album, I'll Make You Music.
Joe Stampley released a version of the song as a single from the 1983 album, Backslidin'''.
Lynn Anderson recorded a version of the song on her 1980 album “Even Cowgirls Get The Blues”
Nick Lowe released a version of the song on his 2001 album, The Convincer.
Mark Oliver Everett (better known as Eels) recorded an acoustic version of the song backed by a mini orchestra on his 2006 live album, Eels with Strings: Live at Town Hall''.

Personnel
 Lead vocals and guitar by Johnny Rivers.
 Piano by Larry Knechtel
 Bass by Joe Osborn
 Drums by Hal Blaine
 Background vocals by The Blossoms: Darlene Love, Fanita James, and Jean King.
 Written by Johnny Rivers and Lou Adler.
 Produced by Lou Adler.

References

External links
 

1966 songs
1966 singles
Johnny Rivers songs
Beverly Bremers songs
Joe Stampley songs
Nick Lowe songs
Eels (band) songs
Songs written by Lou Adler
Song recordings produced by Lou Adler
Billboard Hot 100 number-one singles
Cashbox number-one singles
RPM Top Singles number-one singles
Imperial Records singles